The London Concert is a live album by George Russell released on the French Label Bleu label in 1990, featuring performances by Russell with his Living Time Orchestra recorded at Ronnie Scott's Jazz Club in 1989. The Allmusic review by awarded the album 3 stars.

Track listing
All compositions by George Russell except where noted
Disc One:
 "La Folia: The Roccella Variations" (Russell, Ben Schwendener) - 10:21  
 "Uncommon Ground" - 21:35  
 "Electronic Sonata for Souls Loved by Nature [Events XI-XV]" (Jan Garbarek, Russell) - 19:38  
 "Listen to the Silence: Acknowledgements" - 2:12  
Disc Two:
 "Struggle of the Magicians" (Mark White) - 6:52  
 "Six Aesthetic Gravities" - 19:35  
 "So What" (Miles Davis) - 10:15  
Recorded live at Ronnie Scott's Club, London, August 28–31, 1989.

Personnel
George Russell - conductor, arranger
Stuart Brooks, Ian Carr, Mark Chandler - trumpet  
Pete Beachill - trombone  
Ashley Slater - bass trombone  
Andy Sheppard - tenor saxophone, soprano saxophone
Chris Biscoe - alto saxophone, soprano saxophone, clarinet
Pete Hurt - baritone saxophone, tenor saxophone, bass clarinet, flute  
Brad Hatfield, Steve Lodder - keyboards  
Bill Urmson - Fender bass  
David Fiuczynski - guitar  
Steve Johns - drums  
Dave Adams - percussion

References

George Russell (composer) live albums
Albums recorded at Ronnie Scott's Jazz Club
1990 live albums